Response rate may refer to:

 Response rate (medicine) – the percentage of patients whose cancer shrinks or disappears after treatment
 Response rate (survey) – the percentage of persons asked to answer a survey who actually answer